Tecknau railway station is a railway station in the municipality of Tecknau, in the Swiss canton of Basel-Landschaft. It is an intermediate stop on the base tunnel branch of the standard gauge Hauenstein line of Swiss Federal Railways. It is the first stop north of the Hauenstein base tunnel.

Services 
 the following services stop at Tecknau:

 Basel trinational S-Bahn : half-hourly service between Laufen and Olten, with every other train continuing from Laufen to Porrentruy.

References

External links 
 
 

Railway stations in Basel-Landschaft
Swiss Federal Railways stations